This article describes about the squads for the 2014 OFC Women's Nations Cup.

Cook Islands
The squad was announced on 17 October 2014.

Head coach: Jimmy Katoa

New Zealand
The squad was announced on 13 October 2014.

Head coach: Tony Readings

Papua New Guinea
A 22-player squad was announced on 22 September 2014.

Head coach: Gary Philips

Tonga
Head coach: Kilifi Uele

References

2014